The World at Mind's End (vinyl L.P.) is the only album by English progressive rock band Skywhale, released in 1977 on Firebrand Records. It was produced by Dennis Mann and  features the original line-up of Steve Robshaw, Howard Scarr a.k.a. Gwyo Zepix (formerly of Zorch), Dougall Airmole, Mick Avery, Paul Todd, Stan Thewlis and John Schofield. 
 
The album was written and recorded during 1977, and consists of  six tracks of instrumental rock/jazz fusion songs, featuring guitar, violin, synthesizers, sax, flute, drums, bass and percussion.

Background and recording
The album was recorded over several months at Dennis Mann's basement Mushroom Studios Bristol in West Mall, Clifton, Bristol. This street of Georgian balconied houses is, incidentally, where some members of the band Stackridge lived during the 1970s, and is featured in their song "32 West Mall". The album cover features a surreal, somewhat psychedelic like image of a couple embracing by artist Carl Schofield. It did not chart in the UK, but sold steadily among fans in Bristol the 1970s. The LP was released as a CD in 2006.

Track listing
All songs by Steve Robshaw
Side One

Side Two

References

External links
 AllMusic entry
 Mushroom Studios, Bristol UK

1977 albums